Frydrychowo may refer to the following places:
Frydrychowo, Golub-Dobrzyń County in Kuyavian-Pomeranian Voivodeship (north-central Poland)
Frydrychowo, Wąbrzeźno County in Kuyavian-Pomeranian Voivodeship (north-central Poland)
Frydrychowo, Sępólno County in Kuyavian-Pomeranian Voivodeship (north-central Poland)
Frydrychowo, Pomeranian Voivodeship (north Poland)